Naga Hospital Authority, Kohima (NHAK) is a hospital in Kohima, Nagaland. It was established in 1905 as a ten-bedded dispensary. The dispensary was then upgraded to Kohima Civil Hospital with 60 beds. It was later renamed as Naga Hospital Authority.

The hospital was conferred to autonomous status in 2003 through the Naga Hospital Authority Bill by the Government of Nagaland. In 2011, the hospital became the first in Nagaland to achieve the certification of International Organization for Standardization (ISO) 9001:2008 given by the Indian Register Quality System which was undertaken with technical support of National Health System Resource Centre under NRHM.

See also
 List of hospitals in Nagaland

References

Hospital buildings completed in 1905
1905 establishments in Nagaland
Hospitals established in 1905